The Challenge de España is a golf tournament on the Challenge Tour that is played in Spain. It has run annually since 1999 except in 2005.

Winners

External links
Coverage on the Challenge Tour's official site

Challenge Tour events
Golf tournaments in Spain
1999 establishments in Spain
Recurring sporting events established in 1999